Adrian George Baril (June 4, 1898 – June 10, 1961) was an American football player who played three seasons in the National Football League with the Minneapolis Marines and Milwaukee Badgers. He played college football at the University of St. Thomas.

See also
List of Milwaukee Badgers players

External links
Just Sports Stats
Fanbase profile

1898 births
1961 deaths
Players of American football from Minnesota
American football offensive linemen
St. Thomas (Minnesota) Tommies football players
Minneapolis Marines players
Milwaukee Badgers players
People from Red Lake County, Minnesota
People from Becker, Minnesota